Newell Edenfield (August 10, 1911 – December 26, 1981) was a United States district judge of the United States District Court for the Northern District of Georgia.

Education and career

Born in Emanuel County, Georgia, Edenfield received a Bachelor of Laws from the University of Georgia School of Law in 1938. He was legal editor for Edward Thomson & Co. in Brooklyn, New York from 1938 to 1941, and was then in private practice in Atlanta, Georgia from 1941 to 1942. He was a Lieutenant in the United States Navy during World War II, from 1942 to 1945. He returned to private practice in Atlanta from 1945 to 1967.

Federal judicial service

On May 24, 1967, Edenfield was nominated by President Lyndon B. Johnson to a seat on the United States District Court for the Northern District of Georgia vacated by Judge Frank Arthur Hooper. Edenfield was confirmed by the United States Senate on June 12, 1967, and received his commission the same day. He served as Chief Judge from 1974 to 1976. He assumed senior status on September 1, 1981, and served in that capacity until his death on December 26, 1981.

References

Sources
 

1911 births
1981 deaths
Judges of the United States District Court for the Northern District of Georgia
United States district court judges appointed by Lyndon B. Johnson
20th-century American judges
United States Navy officers